Peter Munro (born 16 November 1957) is  a former Australian rules footballer who played with Footscray in the Victorian Football League (VFL).

Notes

External links 
		

Living people
1957 births
Australian rules footballers from Victoria (Australia)
Western Bulldogs players
Traralgon Football Club players